The Minnesota Golden Gophers represented the University of Minnesota in WCHA women's ice hockey during the 2020-21 NCAA Division I women's ice hockey season. The program did not qualify for the NCAA tournament for the first time since 2007, snapping its streak of 12 consecutive tournament appearances. Among the season highlights, Grace Zumwinkle was recognized as a Second-Team All-America selection.

In the aftermath of the Frozen Four, it was announced that the Golden Gophers were invited to participate in the Smashville NCAA Women's Hockey Showcase this November at the Ford Ice Center, practice facility of the NHL's Nashville Predators.
Also participating in the tournament will be Division I women's hockey programs Boston College, Colgate and Mercyhurst.

Offseason

Recruiting

Regular season

Standings

Schedule
Source:

|-
!colspan=12 style="  "| Regular Season
|-

Roster

2020-21 Gophers

Awards and honors
Lauren Bench, Hockey Commissioners Association Women's Goaltender of the Month (November 2020) 
Grace Zumwinkle, 2020-21 CCM/AHCA Second Team All-American

References

Minnesota Golden Gophers
Minnesota Golden Gophers women's ice hockey seasons